Wulfnoth Godwinson (1040-1094) was a younger brother of Harold II of England, the sixth son of Godwin.

Biography
Wulfnoth was given as a hostage to Edward the Confessor in 1051 as assurance of Godwin's good behaviour and support during the confrontation between the earl and the king which led to the exile of Godwin and his other sons. Upon Godwin's return to England at the head of an army a year later, following extensive preparations in Ireland and Flanders, Norman supporters of King Edward, and especially Archbishop Robert of Jumièges fled England. It is likely at this point that Wulfnoth (and Hakon, son of Svein Godwinson, Godwin's eldest son) were spirited away by the fleeing archbishop, and taken to Normandy, where they were handed over to Duke William of Normandy.

According to  Historia novorum in Anglia by English historian Eadmer, the reason for Harold's excursion to Normandy in 1064 or 1065 was that he wished to free Wulfnoth as well as his nephew Hakon. To this end he took with him a vast amount of wealth, all of which was confiscated by Count Guy I of Ponthieu when Harold and his party were shipwrecked.

However, Harold's reasons for travelling to the continent are not clear, and there are other reasonable explanations, not the least of which was a sounding out among continental magnates of a response to his own intention to ascend the English throne at one point, given Edward's advanced age and lack of heir. When later Harold allegedly swore an oath to William agreeing to become his vassal and to support his succession to the English crown, one of the promises made by William in return, according to Eadmer, was that Wulfnoth would be returned safe and sound when William had become king. Harold's assumption of the crown broke this alleged agreement and Wulfnoth was not released until 1087, by the dying King William I in an amnesty. He was only freed briefly, before King William II Rufus took him to confinement in England.

Of course, there are many other explanations of Wulfnoth's enduring captivity. Even following William's victory at Hastings (1066) over Harold and crowning as King of England in London later that year, England's pacification remained uncertain. William may have held Wulfnoth as hostage against a resurgence of a remnant of Godwinson power.

Wulfnoth stayed in sometimes comfortable, if not enviable, captivity in Normandy and later in Hampshire and Wiltshire, and died in Winchester in 1094, still a prisoner.

Popular culture
On screen, Wulfnoth was portrayed by actor British actor Michael Pennington in the two-part BBC TV play Conquest (1966), part of the series Theatre 625.

References

External links
 

Anglo-Norse people
Anglo-Saxon people
1040 births
11th-century English nobility
House of Godwin
1094 deaths